The Tenth Federal Electoral District of the Federal District (X Distrito Electoral Federal del Distrito Federal) is one of the 300 Electoral Districts into which Mexico is divided for the purpose of elections to the federal Chamber of Deputies and one of 27 such districts in the Federal District ("DF" or Mexico City).

It elects one deputy to the lower house of Congress for each three-year legislative period, by means of the first past the post system.

District territory
Under the 2005 districting scheme, the DF's Tenth District covers the whole of the  borough (delegación) of Miguel Hidalgo.

Previous districting schemes

1996–2005 district
Between 1996 and 2005, the Third District covered the southern two-thirds of  Miguel Hidalgo and a part of  Álvaro Obregón.

Deputies returned to Congress from this district

XLI Legislature
1949–1952: Eduardo Facha Gutiérrez (PAN)
L Legislature
1976–1979: Gloria Carrillo Salinas (PRI)
LI Legislature
1979–1982: Ignacio Zúñiga González (PRI)
LII Legislature
1982–1985: Manuel Osante López (PRI)
LIII Legislature
1985–1988:
LIV Legislature
1988–1991:
LV Legislature
1991–1994:
LVI Legislature
1994–1997: Jaime Jesús Arceo Castro (PRI)
LVII Legislature
1997–2000:
LVIII Legislature
2000–2003: Mauricio Candiani (PAN)
LIX Legislature
2003–2006: Roberto Colín Gamboa (PAN)
LX Legislature
2006–2009: María Gabriela González Martínez (PAN)

References and notes

Federal electoral districts of Mexico
Mexico City